Jenna Butler is an Australian politician.  She was elected to the Tasmanian House of Assembly for the Labor Party in the Division of Lyons at the 2018 state election.

She is the daughter of former Tasmanian MP Heather Butler.

External links
 Official Website

References

Year of birth missing (living people)
Living people
Australian Labor Party members of the Parliament of Tasmania
Members of the Tasmanian House of Assembly
Women members of the Tasmanian House of Assembly
21st-century Australian politicians
21st-century Australian women politicians